HD 61831 (d1 Puppis) is a class B2.5V (blue dwarf) star in the constellation Puppis. Its apparent magnitude is 4.84 and it is approximately 556 light years away based on parallax.

References

Puppis
B-type main-sequence stars
Puppis, d1
CD-38 3531
037297
2961
061831